Groeten uit 19xx (Dutch for Greetings from 19xx) was a Dutch television series broadcast by RTL 4. In the show, a Dutch celebrity and their family revisit the year in which they were twelve years old. In each episode, the main guest and their family live a weekend in a house with home decoration of that year as well as hairstyle, clothing, newspapers, radio and television of that year. Kasper van Kooten presented the first season of the show. The show was also Kasper van Kooten's debut as presenter. The second season of the show was presented by Natasja Froger.

The show is based on a similar Belgian show.

Seasons

Season 1

Season 2

References

External links 
 

2018 Dutch television series debuts
2019 Dutch television series endings
Dutch television shows
RTL 4 original programming
Dutch-language television shows